The O-ring theory of economic development is a model of economic development put forward by Michael Kremer in 1993, which proposes that tasks of production must be executed proficiently together in order for any of them to be of high value. The key feature of this model is positive assortative matching, whereby people with similar skill levels work together.

The name comes from the 1986 Challenger shuttle disaster, a catastrophe caused by the failure of a single O-ring.

Kremer thinks that the O-ring development theory explains why rich countries produce more complicated products, have larger firms and much higher worker productivity than poor countries.

Model 
There are five major assumptions of this model: firms are risk-neutral, labor markets are competitive, workers supply labor inelastically, workers are imperfect substitutes for one another, and there is a sufficient complementarity of tasks.

Production is broken down into  tasks. Laborers can use a multitude of techniques of varying efficiency to carry out these tasks depending on their skill. The concept of  differs depending on interpretation. It could mean: the probability of a laborer successfully completing a task, the quality of task completion expressed as a percentage, or the quality of task completion with the condition of a margin of error that could reduce quality. Output is determined by multiplying the  values of each of the  tasks together and then multiplying this result by another term (let's say ) denoting the individual characteristics of the firm.  is positively correlated with the number of tasks. The production function here is simple:
 

The important implication of this production function is positive assortative matching. We can observe this through a hypothetical four-person economy with two low skill workers and two high skill workers. This equation dictates the productive efficiency of skill matching:
 

By this equation total product is maximized by pairing those with similar skill levels.

Conclusions 

There are several implications one can derive from this model:
 Workers performing the same task earn higher wages in a high-skill firm than in a low-skill firm;
 Wages will be more than proportionately higher in developed countries than would be assumed by measurements of skill levels;
 Workers will consider human capital investments in light of similar investments by those around them;
 This model magnifies the effect of local bottlenecks which also reduce the expected returns to skill;
 O-ring effects across firms can create national low-production traps.

This model helps explain brain drain and international economic disparity. As Kremer puts it, "If strategic complementarity is sufficiently strong, microeconomically identical nations or groups within nations could settle into equilibria with different levels of human capital".

Extensions 

Garett Jones (2013) builds upon Kremer's O-ring theory to explain why differences in worker skills are associated with "massive" differences in international productivity levels despite causing only modest differences in wages within a country. For this purpose, he distinguishes between O-ring jobs - jobs featuring high strategic complementarities in terms of skill - and foolproof jobs - jobs characterized by diminishing returns to labor - and assumes both production technologies to be available to all countries. He then goes on to show that small international variations in average worker skill per country result in both large international and small intra-national income inequality.

References 

Development economics
Human resource management
Labour economics
Organizational structure
Production economics
Workplace
Economic theories